COBW domain-containing protein 1 is a protein that is found in humans and mice. It is encoded by the CBWD1 gene.

References

External links

Further reading